"A Young Girl in 1941 with No Waist at All" is a short story by J. D. Salinger, published in Mademoiselle in May 1947.  The story has not been published in any anthology.  It is of literary interest today largely because the character of Ray is seen as an early version of the character Seymour from Salinger's better known work "A Perfect Day for Bananafish".

Plot

Shoeless Joe and Field of Dreams

The story is also of interest to film buffs.  The name of the main character, Ray Kinsella, is also the name of the main character in the 1982 book Shoeless Joe by W. P. Kinsella (who coincidentally shares the character's last name) which was adapted into the film Field of Dreams (1989).

W.P. Kinsella, who had never met Salinger, created a wholly imagined character (aside from his being a recluse) based on the author of The Catcher in the Rye, a book that had great meaning to him when he was a young man. To get a feel for Salinger, he re-read his body of work.

"I made sure to make him a nice character so that he couldn’t sue me."

Salinger had also used the surname shared by writer and protagonist in The Catcher in the Rye (Holden Caulfield's roommate Richard Kinsella).

Known for his litigiousness, Salinger contacted Kinsella's publisher via his attorneys to express outrage over having been portrayed in Shoeless Joe and intimated he would sue should the character "J. D. Salinger" appear in any other medium, should Shoeless Joe be adapted.

In the novel Shoeless Joe, Ray Kinsella seeks out J. D. Salinger, although in the film this character was renamed Terence Mann as the movie producers were worried over being sued by Salinger. The producers believed that it was not significant to jettison Salinger, as they figured only 15% of the potential audience would know who the author was. Kinsella told Maclean's Magazine in a 2010 interview on the death of Salinger that many of the book's readers believe that Salinger is a wholly fictional character.

Kinsella denied that Salinger, as a writer, had any real influence on his own writing.

References 

Short stories by J. D. Salinger
1947 short stories
Works originally published in Mademoiselle (magazine)